HMS C18 was one of 38 C-class submarines built for the Royal Navy in the first decade of the 20th century. The boat survived the First World War and was sold for scrap in 1921.

Design and description
The C class was essentially a repeat of the preceding B class, albeit with better performance underwater. They displaced  on the surface and  submerged. The C-class submarines had a crew of two officers and fourteen ratings.

For surface running, the boats were powered by a single 16-cylinder  Vickers petrol engine that drove one propeller shaft. When submerged the propeller was driven by a  electric motor. They could reach  on the surface and  underwater.

The boats were armed with two 18-inch (45 cm) torpedo tubes in the bow. They could carry a pair of reload torpedoes, but generally did not as they would have to remove an equal weight of fuel in compensation.

Construction and career

C18 was laid down on 11 March 1907 by Vickers at their Barrow-in-Furness shipyard, launched on 10 October 1908, and completed on 23 July 1909. During World War I, the boat was generally used for coastal defence and training in home waters. HMS C18 was sold for scrap on 26 May 1921 in Sunderland.

Notes

References

External links 
 MaritimeQuest HMS C18 pages

 

British C-class submarines
Royal Navy ship names
1908 ships